Haplosindris is a monotypic snout moth genus described by Pierre Viette in 1953. Its single species, Haplosindris leucotriangula, described by Paul Mabille in 1900, is known from Madagascar.

References

Pyralinae
Monotypic moth genera
Moths of Madagascar
Pyralidae genera